Myokymia is an involuntary, spontaneous, localized quivering of a few muscles, or bundles within a muscle, but which are insufficient to move a joint. One type is superior oblique myokymia.

Myokymia is commonly used to describe an involuntary eyelid muscle contraction, typically involving the lower eyelid or less often the upper eyelid. It occurs in normal individuals and typically starts and disappears spontaneously. However, it can sometimes last up to three weeks. Since the condition typically resolves itself, medical professionals do not consider it to be serious or a cause for concern.

In contrast, facial myokymia is a fine rippling of muscles on one side of the face and may reflect an underlying tumor in the brainstem (typically a brainstem glioma), loss of myelin in the brainstem (associated with multiple sclerosis) or in the recovery stage of Miller-Fisher syndrome, a variant of Guillain–Barré syndrome, an inflammatory polyneuropathy that may affect the facial nerve.

Myokymia in otherwise unrelated body parts may occur in neuromyotonia.

Causes
Frequent contributing factors include: too much caffeine, high levels of anxiety, fatigue, dehydration, stress, overwork, and a lack of sleep. Use of certain drugs or alcohol may also be factors, as can magnesium deficiency. It can be also seen in patients with multiple sclerosis.

Treatment

Many doctors commonly recommend a combined treatment of a warm compress applied to the eyes (to relieve muscle tension, relax the muscles, and reduce swelling), a small dosage of antihistamine (to reduce any swelling that may be caused by an allergic reaction), increased bed rest and decreased exposure to computer screens, televisions, and harsh lighting (to allow muscles to rest), and monitoring caffeine intake (as too much caffeine can cause an adverse reaction such as eye twitching, but a controlled dose can serve as an effective treatment by increasing blood flow).

Etymology 
The term comes from the Greek -mŷs – "muscle," + kŷm, -kŷmia – "something swollen" or -kŷmos – "wave").

See also
 Blepharospasm
 Carnitine palmitoyltransferase II deficiency
 Fasciculation
 Myoclonic jerk (myoclonus)

References

External links 

Symptoms and signs: musculoskeletal system